Turnersville is an unincorporated community in Robertson County, Tennessee, United States.

Notes

Unincorporated communities in Robertson County, Tennessee
Unincorporated communities in Tennessee